The Rochford slider (Lerista rochfordensis)  is a species of skink found in  Queensland in Australia.

References

Lerista
Reptiles described in 2009
Taxa named by Andrew P. Amey
Taxa named by Patrick J. Couper